The  is a Japanese Tokusatsu television series produced by TV Tokyo, Dentsu, OLM, Inc. and created by Takashi Miike. Each season revolves around magical girls who fight against enemies, with a toy line produed by Takara Tomy.

After Idol ×  Warrior Miracle Tunes! was first broadcast in April 2017 with success among its target demographic, four more series followed, grouped under the Kirameki Powers 1990's and ran until last 2022. Following the series' ending, it was succeeded by RizSta: Top of Artists.

Overview 
Each season focuses on elementary school and middle school girls who are given magical items to fight against the forces of evil. They are assisted by fairy mascots and together must battle ordinary people who have been turned evil by the enemy. Their job is to purify these beings and to collect various things which helps them in the battle ahead. As the seasons go on, their magical powers get upgraded, enemies become stronger and along the way, they may gain more members who will assist them in their battles.

Main series 
5 seasons have been announced, and the final, Kirameki Powers, and on June 26, 2022. Miracle Tunes currently has been dubbed in 2 languages and has a European remake. Each of the series has a manga adaptation by Asaka Ogura published in Ciao (magazine) and Yuuki Harami published in Pucchigumi.

 Idol × Warrior Miracle Tunes! (2017-2018)
 Magical × Heroine Magimajo Pures! (2018-2019)
 Secret × Heroine Phantomirage! (2019-2020)
 Police × Heroine Lovepatrina! (2020-2021)
 Bittomo × Heroine Kirameki Powers! (2021-2022)

Movies 
1. Secret × Heroine Phantomirage! The Movie: We'Ve Become A Movie (2020)

2. Police × Heroine Lovepatrina! The Movie: Challenge From A Phantom Thief! Let's Arrest With Love And A Pat! (2021)

Music 
To promote the seasons, a temporary idol group is created with the main cast of the shows. Each group provides the opening and ending theme songs while also holding live performances around the country. When each season is completed, the girls cease activities in the idol groups.

In 2019, a new idol group 'Girls²' was announced. This was a combination group which included members of all three groups. Yuzuha from miracle², Momoka, Misaki, Youka and Kurea from magical² and finally the newest, Minami, Kira and Toa from mirage². Later, Ran Ishii from mirage² also joined Girls². They provided the opening themes for Secret × Heroine Phantomirage! & Police × Heroine Lovepatrina!. In 2021, 'Lucky²' was announced, a combination unit of members from lovely² and the cast of Kirameki Powers. They will provide the opening for Bittomo × Heroine Kirameki Powers!.

1 Miracle² - Idol × Warrior Miracle Tunes! (2017-2018)

2 Magical² - Magical × Heroine MagimajoPures! (2018-2019)

3 Mirage² - Secret × Heroine Phantomirage! Endings Theme (2019-2020)

4 Lovely² - Police × Heroine Lovepatrina! Endings Theme (2020-2021)

5 Girls² - Permanent Idol Group Providing Openings And Movie Songs (2019-Present)

6 Lucky² - Permanent Idol Group Providing Openings And Endings (2021-Present)

Reception
When Idol × Warrior Miracle Tunes! first aired, Confidence and Oricon determined it started a "new genre" for shows aimed at the female toddler to primary school age demographic. The series was viewed as a new female counterpart to the (Ultraman / Kamen Rider / Super Sentai) series due to including female-oriented interests, which were often seen in media targeted to young girls. Sumiko Kodama from Confidence also noted that the show's integration of J-pop elements in collaboration with LDH also made the presentation easy for audiences of all ages to enjoy, as Miracle²'s real-life debut would remind older audiences of Speed. Editors at Real Sound believe the popularity came from the revived interest in live-action Tokusatsu shows aimed at a female audience, which had declined in the early 1990s due to competing toy sales with Sailor Moon and growing interest in Precure series
 The success of the show led to it being a direct competitor to other series for children, particularly the Magical Girl Anime series.

References

External links 
 Official Site

Mass media franchises
Takara Tomy
OLM, Inc.
Japanese drama television series    
Japanese children's television series
Magical girl anime and manga
Magical girl television series
Tokusatsu television series
TV Tokyo original programming